Arenaria montana, the mountain sandwort, is a species of flowering plant in the family Caryophyllaceae, native to mountainous regions of southwestern Europe, from the Pyrenees to Portugal. The Latin specific epithet montana refers to mountains or coming from mountains.

Description

Arenaria montana prefers well drained, sandy to sandy loam soils, of moderate (pH 5.5 to 7.5) acidity. It also prefers moist soils, as its shallow root system leaves it vulnerable to drought.

This plant has gained the Royal Horticultural Society's Award of Garden Merit.

References

montana
Flora of France
Flora of Portugal
Flora of Spain
Flora of the Pyrenees